is a 1991 Japanese film directed by Yōji Yamada. It was chosen as Best Film at the Japan Academy Prize ceremony.

Synopsis
The children of old-fashioned patriarch of a family in Iwate Province gather to observe the first anniversary of their mother's death. Tetsuya, working as a bartender in Tokyo, quarrels with his father over the way he is leading his life.

Cast
 Rentarō Mikuni: Akio Asano
 Masatoshi Nagase: Tetsuo
 Emi Wakui: Seiko Kawashima
 Miyoko Asada: Toshiko
 Kazuyo Asari: Ayako
 Mieko Harada: Reiko
 Chosuke Ikariya : Jirō Katō
 Leonard Kuma
 Tatsuo Matsumura: Terao
 Ken Nakamoto
 Meiko Nakamura
 Tomoko Naraoka
 Ichirō Ogura
 Mikiko Otonashi
 B-saku Satoh
 Casey Takamine
 Kunie Tanaka
 Ryuzo Tanaka: Tadashi

Reception

Awards and nominations
15th Japan Academy Prize 
Won: Best Picture
Won: Best Actor - Rentarō Mikuni
Won: Best Supporting Actor - Masatoshi Nagase
Won: Best Supporting Actress - Emi Wakui
Won: Rookie of the Year - Masatoshi Nagase and Emi Wakui
Nominated: Best Director - Yoji Yamada
Nominated: Best Screenplay - Yoji Yamada and Yoshitaka Asama
Nominated: Best Music - Teizo Matsumura
Nominated: Best Cinematography - Tetsuo Takaba
Nominated: Best Lighting Direction - Yoshifumi Aoki
Nominated: Best Art Direction - Mitsuo Degawa
Nominated: Best Sound Recording - Isao Suzuki and Ryuji Matsumoto
Nominated: Best Film Editing - Iwao Ishii
16th Hochi Film Award 
Won: Best Film
Won: Best Actor - Masatoshi Nagase

References

External links
 
 
 
 
 
 
 

1991 films
Films directed by Yoji Yamada
Japanese romantic comedy films
1990s Japanese-language films
1991 romantic comedy films
Shochiku films
Picture of the Year Japan Academy Prize winners
Best Film Kinema Junpo Award winners
Films with screenplays by Yôji Yamada
1990s Japanese films